Ana Luiza Souza Lima is a Brazilian female sport shooter. At the 2012 Summer Olympics, she competed in the Women's 10 metre air pistol and the Women's 25 metre pistol.

References

Brazilian female sport shooters
Living people
Olympic shooters of Brazil
Shooters at the 2012 Summer Olympics
Pan American Games medalists in shooting
Year of birth missing (living people)
Pan American Games gold medalists for Brazil
Shooters at the 2011 Pan American Games
Medalists at the 2011 Pan American Games
21st-century Brazilian women